Nurtu-Nõlva is a village in Märjamaa Parish, Rapla County in western Estonia. As of the 2011 census, the population was 22.

References 

Villages in Rapla County